Brenda Jagger (born 9 July 1936 in Yorkshire, England – d. 1986) was a British writer of 9 historical romance novels. In 1986, her last novel A Song Twice Over won the Romantic Novel of the Year Award by the Romantic Novelists' Association.

Biography
Brenda Jagger was born on 7 September 1936 in Yorkshire, England, UK. She married, and had three daughters. Before writing, she worked in Paris, France, and as a probation officer in the north of England.

She published her first novel Antonia in 1978, set in Ancient Rome, like her novel Daughter of Aphrodite. Most of her other novels are set in Victorian era Yorkshire, like her popular Barforth Trilogy.

Brenda Jagger died in 1986.

Bibliography

Single novels
 Antonia (1978)
 Daughter of Aphrodite (1981)
 Days of Grace (1983)
 A Winter's Child (1984)
 A Song Twice Over (1985)
 Distant Choices (1986)

The Barforth Trilogy
 The Clouded Hills (1980)  Verity (US title)
 Flint and Roses (1981) a.k.a. The Barforth Women (US title)
 The Sleeping Sword (1982) a.k.a. An Independent Woman (US title)
 The Barforth Trilogy: The Clouded Hills / Flint and Roses / Sleeping Sword (omnibus) (1988)

References and sources

1936 births
1986 deaths
Writers from Yorkshire
English romantic fiction writers
British historical novelists
RoNA Award winners
20th-century English novelists
20th-century English women writers
Women romantic fiction writers
English women novelists
Women historical novelists